Parliamentary elections were held in Iran on 10 April 1992, with a second round on 8 May. The elections were the first parliamentary elections held in Iran since the death of Ayatollah Khomeini and during Ali Khamenei's leadership.

It marked a rivalry between the two main organizations at the time, the right-wing Combatant Clergy Association (supporters of President Akbar Hashemi Rafsanjani) and the left-wing Association of Combatant Clerics. The results marked a victory for the right-wingers who obtained an absolute majority with more than 70 percent of the seats.

Campaign
Main groups contesting in the elections were:
 Combatant Clergy Association, endorsed by Islamic Aligned Organizations
 Association of Combatant Clerics, backed by the Association of the Women of the Islamic Republic and Coalition of Imam's Line groups, including student association Office for Strengthening Unity and trade union Worker House.

Freedom Movement of Iran, the political group led by Mehdi Bazargan, boycotted the elections on the grounds that their rights to compete in fair elections had been curbed and there was official discrimination toward them.

The duration of official campaigns started one week after Ramadan and were limited to seven days, ending 24 hours before the polling process started. The candidates and campaigners were obliged to focus on their merits, rather than negative campaigning. Several taboos on advertisements were broken during the elections, for the first time foreign academic credentials received positive publicity and some campaign literatures were void of regular political and ideological jargon (such as following Imam's Line or highlighting activities against Shah's regime).

Disqualifications 
Some 3,150 candidates registered to run for a seat, but the Guardian Council disqualified about one-third of them, approving only some 2,050. Among the disqualified candidates, 39 were incumbent MPs either belonged to or had sympathized with the Association of Combatant Clerics, including Sadegh Khalkhali, Ateghe Sediqi, Hossein Mousavi Tabrizi, Asadollah Bayat-Zanjani and Ebrahim Asgharzadeh. Behzad Nabavi and Mohammad Khatami, Iran's next president were also disqualified to run.

Results
Baktiari (1996)
The table below only includes seats decided in the first round of voting:

Nohlen et al. (2001)

Rakel (2008)
According to Eva Rakel, the radical left faction gained 79 out of 270 parliamentary seats.

Alem (2011)

Inter-Parliamentary Union
According to Inter-Parliamentary Union, some three-fourths of the seats were controlled by the Combatant Clergy Association, who secured 134 seats in the first round.

References

1992 elections in Iran
April 1992 events in Asia
May 1992 events in Asia
Islamic Consultative Assembly elections
Iran